Hilarographa batychtra is a species of moth of the family Tortricidae. It is found in Tungurahua Province, Ecuador.

References

Moths described in 2005
Hilarographini